Gol Darreh-ye Sofla (also Romanized as Gol Darreh-ye Soflá) is a village in Sanjabi Rural District, Kuzaran District, Kermanshah County, Kermanshah Province, Iran. At the 2006 census, its population was 32, in 7 families.

References 

Populated places in Kermanshah County